In signal processing, pre-emphasis is a technique to protect against anticipated noise. The idea is to boost (and hence distort) the frequency range that is most susceptible to noise beforehand, so that after a noisy process (transmission over cable, tape recording...) more information can be recovered from that frequency range. Removal of the distortion caused by pre-emphasis is called de-emphasis, making the output accurately reproduce the original input.

Emphasis is commonly used in FM broadcasting (preemphasis improvement) and vinyl (e.g. LP) records. For example, high-frequency signal components may be emphasized to produce a more equal modulation index for a transmitted frequency spectrum, and therefore a better signal-to-noise ratio for the entire frequency range.

In waveform signals 

In processing electronic audio signals, pre-emphasis refers to a system process designed to increase (within a frequency band) the magnitude of some (usually higher) frequencies with respect to the magnitude of other (usually lower) frequencies in order to improve the overall signal-to-noise ratio by minimizing the adverse effects of such phenomena as attenuation distortion or saturation of recording media in subsequent parts of the system. The mirror operation is called de-emphasis, and the system as a whole is called emphasis.

Pre-emphasis is achieved with a pre-emphasis network which is essentially a calibrated filter. The frequency response is decided by special time constants. The cutoff frequency can be calculated from that value.

Pre-emphasis is commonly used in telecommunications, digital audio recording, record cutting, in FM broadcasting transmissions, and in displaying the spectrograms of speech signals. One example of this is the RIAA equalization curve on 33 rpm and 45 rpm vinyl records. Another is the Dolby noise-reduction system as used with magnetic tape.

Pre-emphasis is employed in frequency modulation or phase modulation transmitters to equalize the modulating signal drive power in terms of deviation ratio. The receiver demodulation process includes a reciprocal network, called a de-emphasis network, to restore the original signal power distribution.

De-emphasis 
In telecommunication, de-emphasis is the complement of pre-emphasis, in the antinoise system called emphasis.  De-emphasis is a system process designed to decrease, (within a band of frequencies), the magnitude of some (usually higher) frequencies with respect to the magnitude of other (usually lower) frequencies in order to improve the overall signal-to-noise ratio by minimizing the adverse effects of such phenomena as attenuation distortion or saturation of recording media in subsequent parts of the system.

Special time constants dictate the frequency response curve, from which one can calculate the cutoff frequency.

Red Book audio 
Although rarely used, there exists the capability for standardized emphasis in Red Book CD mastering. As CDs were originally intended to work on 14-bit audio, a specification for 'pre-emphasis' was included to compensate for quantization noise. After production specifications were instead set to 16 bits, quantization noise became less of a concern, but emphasis remained an option through standards revisions. The pre-emphasis is described as a first-order filter with a gain of 10 dB (at 20 dB/decade) and time constants 50 μs and 15 μs.

In digital transmission 

In high speed digital transmission, pre-emphasis is used to improve signal quality at the output of a data transmission.  In transmitting signals at high data rates, the transmission medium may introduce distortions, so pre-emphasis is used to distort the transmitted signal to correct for this distortion.  When done properly this produces a received signal which more closely resembles the original or desired signal, allowing the use of higher frequencies or producing fewer bit errors.

In serial data transmission, de-emphasis has a different meaning, which is to reduce the level of all bits except the first one after a transition. That causes the high frequency content due to the transition to be emphasized compared to the low frequency content which is de-emphasized. This is a form of transmitter equalization; it compensates for losses over the channel which are larger at higher frequencies.  Well known serial data standards such as PCI Express, SATA and SAS require transmitted signals to use de-emphasis.

References

External links 
 EmphasisFrequency response and equalization EQConversion: time constant to cut-off frequency and vice versa
 DeemphasisFrequency response and equalization EQConversion: time constant to cut-off frequency and vice versa

Signal processing
Broadcast engineering